Robert William Harker (born 6 March 2000) is an English professional footballer who plays as a forward for FC Halifax Town.

Early life 
Robert William Harker was born 6 March 2000 in the village of Gargrave, North Yorkshire. He attended Aireville School in Skipton until the age of 16. Beginning his footballing career with local side Grassington Juniors, Harker was offered a scholarship with Bury in 2015.

Club career
On 4 October 2016, Harker made his Bury debut in an EFL Trophy tie against Bradford City, replacing Hallam Hope with one minute remaining. The fixture resulted in a 2–1 defeat. He signed on loan for Hartlepool United on 30 January 2020.

In July 2022, he signed for National League side FC Halifax Town on a free transfer.

Career statistics

References

External links

2000 births
Living people
Association football forwards
Bury F.C. players
Burnley F.C. players
Hartlepool United F.C. players
FC Halifax Town players
National League (English football) players
English footballers